This is a list of notable people who have attended the Julian Ashton Art School.

A

 Harold Abbott (1906–1986)
 John E. C. Appleton (1905–1990)
 Julian Howard Ashton (1877–1964)
 Yvonne Audette (born 1930)

Back to top

B

 Herbert Badham (1899–1961), 1925 to 1938
 Laurie Scott Baker (born 1943), commenced 1958
 Jean Bellette (1908–1991), finished 1936
 Portia Mary Bennett (1898–1989)
 Karna Maria Birmingham (1900–1987), 1914 to 1920
 Dorrit Black (1891–1951), 1915
 Florence Turner Blake (1873–1959), commenced 1890
 Viola Macmillan Brown (1897–1981), 1919 to 1922

Back to top

C

 Leon Coward (born 1991)
 Max Cullen (born 1940), 1959

Back to top

D

 Anne Dangar (1885–1951)
 Una Deerbon (1882–1972)
 Paul Delprat (born 1942)
 William Dobell (1899–1970), commenced 1925

Back to top

F

 Adrian Feint (1894–1971), commenced 1911
 Roger Fletcher (born 1949)

Back to top

G

 Jules de Goede (1937–2007)
 Geoffrey de Groen (born 1938)
 Elioth Gruner (1882–1939)

Back to top

H

 Paul Haefliger (1914–1982), finished 1936
 Edmund Arthur Harvey (1907–1994), 1922 to 1925
 Edwin James Hayes (1918–1997), 1935
 Ralph Heimans
 Nora Heysen (1911–2003), 1931
 J. J. Hilder (1881–1916), 1906

Back to top

J

 Lionel Jago (1882–1953)
 Charles Lloyd Jones (1878–1958), commenced 1895

Back to top

L

 George Washington Lambert (1873–1930), finished 1900
 George Lawrence (1901–1981)
 Bill Leak (1956–2017), 1974 to 1975
 Fred Leist (1873–1945)
 Norman Lloyd (1895–1983), commenced 1911

Back to top

M

 Roy De Maistre (1894–1968)
 Jeffrey Makin, 1961
 Alexander McKenzie (born 1971), finished 1994
 Emile Mercier (1901–1981)

Back to top

N

 Kim Nelson (1958–2015), 1976
 Paul Newton
 Deborah Niland (born 1950)
 Kilmeny Niland (1950–2009)

Back to top

O

 John Olsen (born 1928), 1950 to 1953

Back to top

P

 Wendy Paramor (1938–1975)
 John Passmore (1904–1984)
 Don Peebles (1922-2010)
 Olive Pink (1884–1975)
 Thea Proctor (1879–1966), commenced 1896

Back to top

R

 Alison Rehfisch (1900–1974), 1916 to 1919
 Lola Ridge (1873–1941)
 Florence Aline Rodway (1881–1971)
 Dan Russell (1906–1999)
 Jim Russell (1909–2001)

Back to top

S

 Joshua Smith (1905–1995)
 Sydney Ure Smith (1887–1949), 1902 to 1907
 Helen Stewart (1900–1983), commenced 1930

Back to top

T

 Madge Tennent (1889-1972)
 Nigel Thomson (1945–1999)

Back to top

W

 Susan Dorothea White (born 1941)
 Brett Whiteley (1939–1992)
 Wendy Whiteley (born 1941)

Back to top

Z

 Salvatore Zofrea (born 1946)

Back to top

 
Julian Ashton Art School